The Gulf Coast Bandits were a World Basketball Association franchise in Biloxi, Mississippi. The Bandits sat out the 2006 season due to Hurricane Katrina and have since gone out of business.

External links
Official Website

World Basketball Association teams
2005 establishments in Mississippi
2005 disestablishments in Mississippi
Basketball teams established in 2005
Basketball teams disestablished in 2005
Sports in Biloxi, Mississippi